This is a list of all sumo wrestlers whose pinnacle in the sport has been the third highest rank of sekiwake and who held the rank in the modern era of sumo since the 1927 merger of the Tokyo and Osaka organizations.  There are usually two active sekiwake. Wrestlers who went on to be promoted to ōzeki and yokozuna can be seen in the list of ōzeki and list of yokozuna.

The number of tournaments (basho) at sekiwake is also listed. Wrestlers who won a top division yūshō are indicated in bold. Active wrestlers (December 2022) are indicated by italics.

The longest-serving sekiwake of modern times, who did not achieve further promotion, have been Hasegawa and Kotonishiki who each held the rank for 21 tournaments (Kotomitsuki was ranked at sekiwake for 22 tournaments before being promoted to ōzeki).

List

* Wrestler held the rank on at least two separate occasions.

See also
List of active sumo wrestlers
List of past sumo wrestlers
List of sumo tournament top division champions
List of sumo tournament second division champions
List of yokozuna
List of ōzeki
List of komusubi

Notes

sekiwake
Lists of sumo wrestlers
 List